Shannon Renee' Magrane (born October 21, 1995) is an American singer from Tampa, Florida, who finished in eleventh place on the eleventh season of American Idol.

Early life
Her father is former St. Louis Cardinals pitcher and former Tampa Bay Rays broadcaster Joe Magrane.  Magrane graduated from Howard W. Blake High School.

American Idol
Magrane auditioned in Savannah, Georgia. In the semi-finals she performed "Go Light Your World" by Kathy Troccoli.  She was one of the top five female vote getters and advanced to the top 13.  In the top 13 she performed "I Have Nothing" by Whitney Houston and was one of the bottom three female voter getters, but was declared safe. In the top 11, she performed "One Sweet Day" by Mariah Carey and Boyz II Men and was eliminated.

Performances/results

 When Ryan Seacrest announced the results for this particular night, Magrane was among the Bottom 3 Women but declared safe second, as Elise Testone was declared as the bottom female vote getter.

Post-Idol
Magrane appeared on The Today Show and Anderson on March 20, 2012.
On April 13, 2012 Magrane performed "The Star-Spangled Banner" at Busch Stadium prior to the season home opener of the St. Louis Cardinals.  She also performed at the official welcome party of the 2012 Republican National Convention.
Since then, Magrane has released her first single Weather and is currently working on new music.

Voice
Magrane possesses the vocal range of a mezzo-soprano.

References

External links
 Official website
 Shannon Magrane on American Idol
 

1995 births
Living people
21st-century American singers
American Idol participants
Musicians from Tampa, Florida
American child singers
American mezzo-sopranos
Singers from Florida
21st-century American women singers